Bennett Jones LLP is a law firm based in Canada.

Firm 
For over a century, Bennett Jones has been an internationally recognized Canadian law firm. 

Bennett Jones is home to more than 500 lawyers and business advisors in seven offices—Calgary, Toronto, Edmonton, Ottawa, Vancouver, Montréal and New York. The firm advises clients in virtually every sector of business, industry and government.

Notable alumni and advisors
 John Baird (Canadian politician) - Former Canadian politician who served as Minister of Foreign Affairs under Prime Minister Stephen Harper (2011–15)
 R. B. Bennett – Founding partner and former Prime Minister of Canada (1930–35) 
David A. Dodge – Senior Advisor and former Governor of the Bank of Canada (2001–08) 
Allan Gotlieb, CC – Senior advisor and former Canadian ambassador to the United States of America (1981–89)
Michael Kergin – Senior advisor and former Canadian ambassador to the United States of America (2000–05) 
John C. Major ("Jack") – Counsel and former Puisne Justice of the Supreme Court of Canada (1992–2005)
Anne McLellan, PC, OC – Counsel, former Member of Parliament (1993–2006) and former Deputy Prime Minister of Canada (2003–06)
Henry Grattan Nolan, MC - Former Puisne Justice of the Supreme Court of Canada (1956–57)
Christy Clark - senior advisor and former Premier of British Columbia (2011–2017)
Jason Kenney, PC, ECA - Senior advisor, former Premier of Alberta (2019–2022), former Minister of National Defense (2015)

History

Bennett Jones was founded in Calgary in 1922 with the dissolution of a 25-year partnership between R.B. Bennett and Sir James Alexander Lougheed (Lougheed, Bennett & Company) and the creation of the new partnership Bennett, Hannah & Sanford.

The firm expanded to Edmonton (1982) and then eastward to Toronto (1989) and Ottawa (1989–95, 2009). In 2018, the firm merged with Vancouver firm McCullough O'Connor Irwin and opened an office in New York.

Notes

Further reading
Saucier, J.J. (1982). The Bennett Firm: Revisited. Bennett Jones.
Batten, Jack (1997). A History of Bennett Jones Verchere. Bennett Jones Verchere. .

External links

Law firms of Canada
Law firms established in 1922
1922 establishments in Alberta